Palm Springs (alternate title: Palm Springs Affair) is a 1936 film directed by Aubrey Scotto which features an early performance by David Niven.

Plot
A father and daughter who love to gamble throw a party in honor of her leaving to attend  finishing school. However, when she gets to the school she is caught gambling and is promptly expelled.

While trying to locate her father in Palm Springs, California, she meets a cowboy named Slim and a wealthy gentleman named George Brittel, whose aunt Letty is totally against gambling. Nevertheless, she and George bet and before they know it they’re having dinner at a fancy restaurant. In the gambling room, Joan discovers her father gambling and finds out the truth behind their financial situation, so she decides to marry George for his money. Complications ensue when she changes her identity to Lady Sylvia of Dustin and she realizes the cowboy is the one she is in love with.

Cast
 Frances Langford as Joan
 Guy Standing as Capt. Smith
 David Niven as Brittel
 Spring Byington as Aunt Letty
 Smith Ballew as Slim
 E. E. Clive as Morgan
 Sterling Holloway
 Grady Sutton
 Ann Doran
 Kirby Grant Hoon
 Fuzzy Knight
 Etta McDaniel
 Jack Mower
 Sarah Edwards
 Cyril Ring
 Lee Phelps
 Eddie Tamblyn
 Fred "Snowflake" Toones
 Maidel Turner

Reception
The film recorded a loss of $154,089.

References

External links
 
 
 

1936 films
Films directed by Aubrey Scotto
Films based on short fiction
Films set in Palm Springs, California
Films shot in California
Films produced by Walter Wanger
American black-and-white films
American comedy-drama films
1936 comedy-drama films
Paramount Pictures films
1930s American films